Robert Frank Leslie (fl. 1918–1994) was professor of history at Queen Mary University of London. His papers are held by Queen Mary Archives. He was a specialist in modern Polish history.

Selected publications
 Polish Politics and the Revolution of November, 1830. Athlone Press, London, 1956. (new edition 1969)
 Reform and Insurrection in Russian Poland, 1856-1865. Athlone Press, London, 1963. (University of London Historical Studies  No. 13)
 The Age of Transformation, 1789-1871. Blandford Press, London, 1964.
 The Polish Question: Poland's Place in Modern History. Historical Association, London, 1964.
 The History of Poland since 1863. Cambridge University Press, Cambridge, 1980. (Editor and contributor)

References 

Academics of Queen Mary University of London
Historians of Poland
20th-century English historians
Year of birth uncertain
Year of death uncertain